The Directorate-General for Defence Industry and Space (DG DEFIS) is a department of the European Commission.

Tasks
The directorate, established in January 2021, leads the European Commission's activities in the Defence Industry and Space sector. Some of its tasks were transferred from the Directorate-General for Internal Market, Industry, Entrepreneurship and SMEs (DG GROW). 

In the area of Defence Industry, DEFIS is in charge of upholding the competitiveness and innovation of the European Defence industry by ensuring the evolution of an able European defence technological and industrial base.

In the area of Space DG DEFIS is in charge of implementing the EU Space programme consisting of the European Earth Observation Programme (Copernicus), the European Global Navigation Satellite System (Galileo) and the European Geostationary Navigation Overlay Service (EGNOS).

See also
European Commissioner for Internal Market
High Representative of the Union for Foreign Affairs and Security Policy
European Union Agency for the Space Programme
European Space Agency (non-EU body)
Common Security and Defence Policy
European Defence Agency

References

External links
Directorate-General for Defence Industry and Space
Press release, Europa
Information, Europa

Defence Industry and Space
Military of the European Union